Shady Bard are an indie rock band formed in Birmingham, England in 2004, by multi-instrumentalists Lawrence Becko and Tom Rogers. 

Their music is characterised by complex arrangements and unusual instrumentation of lo-fi folk-influenced indie music. Lyrically their work revolves around issues of ecology and the environment. Their music has featured as part of a global warming campaign on MTV and within American TV programmes such as Grey's Anatomy and The Vampire Diaries.

Discography

Albums

References

Musical groups established in 2004
Musical groups from Birmingham, West Midlands
2004 establishments in England
English indie rock groups
Static Caravan Recordings artists